Ciro Foggia (born 25 March 1991) is an Italian professional footballer who plays as a forward for Serie D club Cavese.

Club career
On 29 July 2021, he signed with Arezzo.

On 4 February 2022, he joined Serie D club Cavese.

References

External links

1991 births
Living people
Footballers from Naples
Italian footballers
Association football forwards
Serie C players
Serie D players
Eccellenza players
A.C. Bellaria Igea Marina players
S.S.D. Puteolana 1902 Internapoli players
A.S. Melfi players
S.S. Teramo Calcio players
A.S.D. Sicula Leonzio players
S.S.D. Audace Cerignola players
A.C.R. Messina players
S.S. Arezzo players
Cavese 1919 players